Madhuri is an Indian actress who performed in a number of Tamil-language and Malayalam-language films during the 1980s and early 1990s. She was one of the leading contemporary actress of her time appearing in numerous performance oriented tamil films.

Partial filmography

References

External links

Living people
Indian film actresses
Actresses in Tamil cinema
Actresses in Malayalam cinema
Year of birth missing (living people)
Actresses from Madurai
Actresses in Telugu cinema
20th-century Indian actresses